Jeremy Taylor (born 17 June 1992) is an Australian rules football player with the Gold Coast Football Club in the Australian Football League (AFL).

He made his AFL debut for the Gold Coast in Round 19 of the 2011 AFL season against St Kilda.  He had performed well in the pre-season games, but a groin injury that required surgery delayed his AFL debut to near the end of the season.

References

External links

1992 births
Living people
Gold Coast Football Club players
Australian rules footballers from Victoria (Australia)
Geelong Falcons players
People educated at Geelong College